Léopold Montagnier (1880 – April 1943) was a Swiss fencer. He competed in the team épée event at the 1920 Summer Olympics.

References

1880 births
1943 deaths
Swiss male fencers
Olympic fencers of Switzerland
Fencers at the 1920 Summer Olympics